Anke Huber was the defending champion, but lost in semifinals to Lori McNeil.

Steffi Graf won the title by defeating Lori McNeil 6–1, 4–6, 6–3 in the final.

Seeds
The top four seeds received a bye into the second round.

Draw

Finals

Top half

Bottom half

References
 Official results archive (ITF)
 Official results archive (WTA)

Advanta Championships of Philadelphia
1995 WTA Tour